Pegtop Mountain is an elongated mountain marked by several conspicuous knobs, the highest and westernmost rising to 1,395 m, situated at the south side of Mackay Glacier, 3 nautical miles (6 km) west of Sperm Bluff; in Victoria Land. Mapped and given this descriptive name by the British Antarctic Expedition, 1910–13.

Mountains of Victoria Land
Scott Coast